James Macharia may refer to:

James Mwangi Macharia (born 1984), Kenyan road running athlete
James Wainaina Macharia (born 1959), Kenyan accountant and Cabinet Secretary for Health